R. K. Schnader & Sons Tobacco Warehouse is a historic tobacco warehouse located at Lancaster, Lancaster County, Pennsylvania. It was built about 1890, and is a two-story, rectangular red brick building with a raised basement on a stuccoed foundation.  It is three bays wide by forty five feet deep, and has a moderately pitched gable roof.  It is a few doors from the Walter Schnader Tobacco Warehouse.

It was listed on the National Register of Historic Places in 1990.

References

Industrial buildings and structures on the National Register of Historic Places in Pennsylvania
Industrial buildings completed in 1890
Buildings and structures in Lancaster, Pennsylvania
Tobacco buildings in the United States
National Register of Historic Places in Lancaster, Pennsylvania